Abdulaziz Al-Harabi (born 28 May 1997) is a Saudi Arabian professional footballer who plays as a midfielder for Pro League side Al-Tai, where he is the club captain.

Club career
Al-Harabi started his career at Al-Tai and made his first-team debut on 23 April 2016 in the final league match of the 2015–16 season against Al-Ettifaq. In the 2016–17 season Al-Harabi made 8 appearances and made 0 appearances in the 2017–18 season. On 12 July 2019, Al-Harabi renewed his contract with Al-Tai. On 20 August 2019, he scored his first league goal for Al-Tai in the 2–1 win against Al-Bukiryah. During the 2020–21 season, Al-Harabi made 34 appearances and scored 3 goals and captained Al-Tai to promotion to the Pro League.

Career statistics

Club

References

External links
 

1997 births
Living people
Saudi Arabian footballers
Association football midfielders
Al-Tai FC players
Saudi First Division League players
Saudi Professional League players